Omentum (Latin for 'apron') is a medical term referring to layers  of peritoneum that surround abdominal organs. The term may refer to:
 Greater omentum
 Lesser omentum